Better Generation is Marty Balin's 1991 album and his first solo album since 1983. The album was produced shortly after Jefferson Airplane's reunion album and tour, without any other members of Jefferson Airplane involved. Balin's wife, Karen Deal, co-wrote a song on the album, and played keyboards on most tracks.

Track listing
"Better Generation" (George M. Green, Rick Giles) – 5:33
"Skydiver" (Marty Balin, Karen Deal) – 7:14
"Mercy of the Moon" (Al Staehely) – 6:20
"Green Light" (Gene Heart, David Evan) – 4:31
"Let It Live" (Balin) – 3:27
"Wish I Were" (Balin) – 1:40
"Don't Change on Me" (Eddie Reeves, Jimmy Holiday) – 3:26
"Let's Go" (Balin) – 4:11
"See the Light" (Jesse Barish) – 4:06
"It's No Secret" (Balin) – 2:30
"Even Though" (Billy Crain) – 4:24
"Always Tomorrow" (Kerry Kearney) – 4:11
"Treadin' Water" (Gary Harrison, Karen Staley, Kent Robbins) – 5:20
"Lady Now" (Kearney) – 3:46
"Volunteers" (Balin, Paul Kantner) – 3:18
"Summer of Love" (Balin) – 4:19

Personnel
Marty Balin - acoustic guitar, percussion, vocals
Karen Deal - keyboards, keyboard bass, backing vocals
Kerry Kearney - electric lead guitar, bass guitar, 6- and 12-string acoustic guitars, mandolin, backing vocals
Ed Michaels - drums

Personnel on "Mercy of the Moon"
Harry Stinson - drums
Willie Weeks - bass
Richard Bennett - electric guitar
Bernie Leadon - mandola
Biff Watson - gut string guitar
Sonny Garrish - pedal steel
John Jarvis - piano
Phil Naish - synthesizer
Terry McMillan - harmonica

References

1991 albums
Marty Balin albums